The 23rd Government of Ireland (12 January 1993 – 15 December 1994) was the government formed following the 1992 general election to the 27th Dáil held on 25 November 1992. It was a coalition of Fianna Fáil, with leader Albert Reynolds as Taoiseach, and the Labour Party, with leader Dick Spring as Tánaiste. It was the first time that these two parties were in government together; on each previous occasion Labour was in government, it was a junior coalition party with Fine Gael. The government lasted for  days from its appointment until its resignation on 17 November 1994, and continued to carry out its duties for a further 28 days until the appointment of its successor, giving a total of  days.

The 27th Dáil lasted until 1997, but the first government fell in 1994 after the breakdown of relations between the two parties. It was succeeded in December 1994 by the 24th Government, a coalition of Fine Gael, with leader John Bruton as Taoiseach, Labour, with Dick Spring serving again as Tánaiste, and Democratic Left, led by Proinsias De Rossa. This was the only time a government with a new coalition of parties was formed within a single Dáil term.

Nomination of Taoiseach
The 27th Dáil first met on 14 December 1992. In the debate on the nomination of Taoiseach, Fianna Fáil leader and outgoing Taoiseach Albert Reynolds, Fine Gael leader John Bruton and Labour Party leader Dick Spring were each proposed. None of these proposals were passed by the Dáil: Reynolds received 68 votes in favour with 94 against, Bruton received 55 in favour to 107 against, and Spring received 39 in favour to 122 against. Reynolds resigned as Taoiseach and continued in a caretaker capacity.

On 12 January 1993, Albert Reynolds and John Bruton were again proposed for the nomination of the Dáil for the position of Taoiseach, and on this occasion, the nomination of Reynolds was successful by 102 votes to 60. Reynolds was then appointed as Taoiseach by President Mary Robinson.

Members of the Government
After his appointment as Taoiseach by the president, Albert Reynolds proposed the members of the government and they were approved by the Dáil. They were appointed by the president on the same day.

Notes

Attorney General
On 12 January 1993 Harry Whelehan SC was appointed by the president as Attorney General on the nomination of the Taoiseach. He resigned as Attorney General on 11 November 1994 on his nomination as President of the High Court (a position he would serve in for only two days). On 11 November 1994, Eoghan Fitzsimons SC was appointed by the president as Attorney General on the nomination of the Taoiseach.

Ministers of State
On 12 January 1993, the Government on the nomination of the Taoiseach appointed Noel Dempsey to the post of Minister for State at the Department of the Taoiseach with special responsibility as Government Chief Whip. On 14 January 1993, the Government on the nomination of the Taoiseach appointed the other Ministers of State.

Confidence in the government
After the sum of European Structural and Investment Funds allocated to Ireland was lower than previously announced, a motion of no confidence was proposed in the government. This was then debated on 28 October 1993 as a motion of confidence in the government, proposed by the Taoiseach. It was approved by a vote of 94 to 55.

Resignation of government
In November 1994, the Attorney General, Harry Whelehan was nominated by the government as President of the High Court. It emerged that he had failed to expedite the extradition of Fr Brendan Smyth to Northern Ireland for sexual offences committed against children. The appointment of Whelehan to the court despite this led to a motion of no confidence in the government. Reynolds responded on 16 November by proposing a motion reaffirming the confidence of the Dáil in the Taoiseach and the Government.

On the following day, 17 November, Labour withdrew from the government and Reynolds resigned as Taoiseach. The motion of confidence in the government was withdrawn. Reynolds and the Fianna Fáil ministers continued to carry on their duties until their successors were appointed on 15 December.

References

1993 establishments in Ireland
1994 disestablishments in Ireland
27th Dáil
Cabinets established in 1993
Cabinets disestablished in 1994
Coalition governments of Ireland
Governments of Ireland